Take It Big is a 1944 American comedy film directed by Frank McDonald and written by Howard J. Green and Joe Bigelow. The film stars Jack Haley, Harriet Hilliard, Mary Beth Hughes, Richard Lane, Arline Judge and Fritz Feld. Also featured is Hilliard's husband in real life, bandleader Ozzie Nelson.

The film was released on June 9, 1944, by Paramount Pictures.

Plot

She is a singer in a nightclub, but Jerry Clinton has been rejecting other jobs and other suitors because of her romantic feelings toward Jack North, who does a comic act inside a horse's costume with his partner, Eddie Hampton.

Jack inherits a dude ranch out west. When he, Jerry and Eddie arrive, they are pleased to find it a beautiful place, unaware that they have mistakenly gone to the wrong ranch. Jack acts as boss, implementing many peculiar ideas and attracting flirtation from gold digger Gaye Livingston, until real owner Harvey Phillips turns up.

Jack's actual ranch is a rundown mess. Jerry and others persuade him that it can be improved into a prosperous place just like the other, and before long Jack's ranch is attracting tourists, also drawn by Ozzie Nelson and his Orchestra being booked to entertain there. Harvey resents the competition and intends to call in an overdue loan immediately, but Jack enters a rodeo, wins first prize in the bucking bronco competition and pays off the debt.

Cast 
Jack Haley as Jack North
Harriet Hilliard as Jerry Clinton
Mary Beth Hughes as Gaye Livingston
Richard Lane as Eddie Hampton
Arline Judge as Pert Martin
Fritz Feld as Doctor Dittenhoffer
Lucile Gleason as Sophie
Fuzzy Knight as Cowboy Joe
Frank Forest as Harvey Phillips
George Meeker as John Hankinson
Nils T. Granlund as NTG 
Ozzie Nelson as Ozzie Nelson
Ralph Peters as House Detective
Andy Mayo as Pansy the Dancing Horse
Florence Mayo as Pansy the Dancing Horse

Production
Pine-Thomas Productions were a unit that operated out of Paramount pictures which specialised in low budget action films. They were keen to diversify into other genres. In June 1943 Pine-Thomas signed a new contract with Paramount which included three musicals, and two bigger budgeted pictures, plus three wartime movies which would co-star Chester Morris and Russell Hayden. Jack Haley was signed to appear in two of the musicals with Mary Beth Hughes. His fee was $20,000 a film. The films were to be Rhythm Range, about an all girl rodeo, and The Duchess Rides High, about vaudeville. Rhythm Ranch became Take it Big.

Pine Thomas filmed some scenes on Clara Bow's ranch.

References

External links 
 
Review of film at Variety

1944 films
1940s English-language films
Paramount Pictures films
American comedy films
1944 comedy films
Films directed by Frank McDonald
American black-and-white films
1940s American films